Edible plants include:
 List of culinary fruits
 List of culinary herbs and spices
 List of culinary nuts
 List of edible cacti
 List of edible flowers
 List of edible seeds
List of forageable plants (edible plants commonly found in the wild) 
 List of leaf vegetables
 List of root vegetables
 List of vegetables

See also
 Edible seaweed
 List of domesticated plants
 Medicinal plants
 List of plants used in herbalism
 Plantas Alimentícias Não Convencionais
 Crop

 

Sources:
https://www.mossyoak.com/edible-plants